Andrew Underwood is a former Australian rules footballer who played for Essendon and Richmond in the Victorian Football League (VFL). He made his debut with Essendon against the West Coast Eagles in round 1 of the 1989 VFL season, kicking a goal on debut. Underwood played 12 games at Essendon over two seasons and joined Richmond in 1991, playing another 12 matches.

References

External links

1967 births
Living people
Essendon Football Club players
Richmond Football Club players
Sturt Football Club players
Australian rules footballers from South Australia